Alexander Joseph Lindo was Jamaican merchant, planter, member of House of Assembly of Jamaica and Custos rotulorum of St. Mary.

Life 
He was the son of Joseph Alexandre Lindo (1777-1816) and Sarah DaSilva. 
Appointed inspector and director of the Public Hospital and Lunatic Asylum c. 21 March 1865.

References 

1799 births
1867 deaths